Tau Sagittarii (Tau Sgr, τ Sagittarii, τ Sgr) is a star in the southern zodiac constellation of Sagittarius.

Description
With an apparent visual magnitude of +3.3, this is one of the brighter members of the constellation.

The stellar envelope is slightly cooler than the Sun with an effective temperature of 4,459 K, giving the star a light orange color.

τ Sagittarii is a suspected double star although no companion has been confirmed yet. A lower metal content (Fe to H ratio is 54% lower than the sun's) and a high peculiar velocity (64 km/s, four times the local average) relative to the Sun suggest the star is a visitor from a different part of the Galaxy. 

τ  Sagittarii is a red clump giant, a star with a similar mass to the sun which has exhausted its core hydrogen, passed through the red giant branch, and started helium fusion in its core.

The Wow! signal
τ Sagittarii is the closest constellational star (a star that is part of the traditional outline of a constellation) to the origin of the 1977 Wow! signal.

Name and etymology
 The star forms part of simple asterisms:
 γ Sgr,  τ Sgr, δ Sgr, ε Sgr, ζ Sgr, λ Sgr, σ Sgr and φ Sgr — the Teapot.
 φ Sgr,  τ Sgr, ζ Sgr, χ Sgr (double) and σ Sgr — the Returning Ostriches; in Arabic Al Naʽām al Ṣādirah often transliterated as Namalsadirah (النعم السادرة).
 Originally four stars in a numerical order: φ Sgr, τ Sgr, χ1 Sgr and χ2 Sgr
 ν Sgr,  τ Sgr, ψ Sgr, ω Sgr, 60 Sgr and ζ Sgr, Al Udḥiyy — the Ostrich's Nest.
 In the entirely separate Chinese tradition  — , meaning Dipper: τ Sgr, φ Sgr, λ Sgr, μ Sgr, σ Sgr and ζ Sgr.

References

K-type giants
Horizontal-branch stars
Sagittarius (constellation)
Sagittarii, Tau
Durchmusterung objects
Sagittarii, 40
177716
093864
7234